
Gmina Kozielice is a rural gmina (administrative district) in Pyrzyce County, West Pomeranian Voivodeship, in north-western Poland.

Villages
Gmina Kozielice contains the villages and settlements of Czarnowo, Kozielice, Łozice, Maruszewo, Mielno Pyrzyckie, Przydarłów, Rokity, Siemczyn, Tetyń, Trzebórz, Trzebórz-Podborze, Zadeklino and Załęże.

Neighbouring gminas
Gmina Kozielice is bordered by the gminas of Banie, Bielice, Myślibórz and Pyrzyce.

References
Polish official population figures 2006

Kozielice
Pyrzyce County